A pisolite is a sedimentary rock made of pisoids, which are concretionary grains – typically of calcium carbonate which resemble ooids, but are more than 2 mm in diameter. These grains are approximately spherical and have concentric layers reaching 10 mm in diameter.

Bauxites, limonites, and siderites often have a pisolitic structure.

See also
 Ooid
 Oolite

References

Further reading

Sedimentary rocks